Johnson Gakumba (born February 25, 1959)  is an Anglican bishop in Uganda: he has been  Bishop of Northern Uganda since 2009.

Gakumba was born at Kiswata, Masindi District. He was educated at Uganda Christian University and ordained in 1983. He has served in Bobi, Kitgum and Luzira.

References

Uganda Christian University alumni
Anglican bishops of Northern Uganda
21st-century Anglican bishops in Uganda
Living people
1959 births
People from Masindi District